Loxocera collaris is a species of rust flies in the family Psilidae.

References

Psilidae
Articles created by Qbugbot
Insects described in 1869